Curl Osmond Thompson was a Belizean politician. Thompson served as an Area Representative in the Belize House of Representatives and as Deputy Prime Minister. He was also interim leader of the United Democratic Party for a brief period in the early 1980s.

Biography 
Thompson was the UDP's nominee for the Belize House in the Belize City-based Mesopotamia constituency in 1974, but was defeated by the People's United Party incumbent, C. L. B. Rogers. Thompson was elected to the seat in a 1979 rematch. In January 1983 Thompson became Leader of the Opposition upon Theodore Aranda's departure from the UDP, serving concurrently as interim party leader until Sen. Manuel Esquivel was elected as Aranda's permanent replacement, with Thompson becoming deputy party leader. Thompson served as deputy prime minister during the first Esquivel government from 1984 to 1989.

Thompson was posthumously awarded the Order of Belize in September 2010.  Curl Thompson Street in Belize City and the Curl Thompson Building in Belmopan are named after him.

References

Date of birth missing
Date of death missing
People from Belize City
United Democratic Party (Belize) politicians
Government ministers of Belize
Deputy Prime Ministers of Belize
Members of the Belize House of Representatives for Mesopotamia